The Rent Collector is a 1921 American silent comedy film directed by Larry Semon and Norman Taurog. It featured Semon and Oliver Hardy. It was produced by Larry Semon's production company and distributed by the Vitagraph Company of America.

Cast
 Larry Semon as Larry, the Rent Collector
 Norma Nichols as Leader of the Society Girl Settlement Workers
 Oliver Hardy as The Big Boss (credited as Babe Hardy)
 Eva Thatcher as Landlady
 Frank Alexander as A thug
 Pete Gordon as Barber
 William Hauber as Bit Role (uncredited)
 Leo Willis as Bit Role (uncredited)

See also
 List of American films of 1921
 Oliver Hardy filmography

References

External links

1921 films
1921 comedy films
1921 short films
American silent short films
American black-and-white films
Films directed by Larry Semon
Silent American comedy films
American comedy short films
1920s American films
1920s English-language films
English-language comedy films